The Ultimate Warrior (born James Hellwig) was an American professional wrestler.

The Ultimate Warrior or Ultimate Warrior may also refer to the following:

The Ultimate Warrior (film), a 1975 science fiction and action-adventure film directed by Robert Clouse
Musa (film), a South Korean film also titled The Ultimate Warrior
Ultimate Warrior (mixtape), a mixtape by rapper Starlito
Barbarian: The Ultimate Warrior, 1987 video game
"Ultimate Warrior", a title used for the champion of Raven
Computer Warrior comic strip, previously named Ultimate Warrior

See also
 Jon Richardson: Ultimate Worrier, a British panel show